The 2020 Pac-12 Conference football season was the 42nd season of Pac-12 football taking place during the 2020 NCAA Division I FBS football season. The season was originally scheduled to begin on September 26, 2020, and end with the 2020 Pac-12 Championship Game on December 18–19, 2020, at Allegiant Stadium in Las Vegas, Nevada. On July 10, 2020, the Pac-12 announced that all competition in fall sports, including football, will be played exclusively in-conference due to the COVID-19 pandemic. On August 11, 2020, the Pac-12 Conference suspended all fall sports competitions due to the ongoing pandemic. On September 24, 2020 the Pac-12 Conference announced that the postponement of fall sports was to be ended and teams will return to play with a six-game Conference-only season to begin on November 6, and the Pac-12 Championship Game on December 18 with the rest of the conference seeded for a seventh game.

The Pac-12 is a Power Five Conference under the College Football Playoff format along with the Atlantic Coast Conference, the Big 12 Conference, Big Ten Conference, and the Southeastern Conference. The 2020 season is the tenth for the twelve Pac-12 teams to be divided into two divisions of six teams each, named North and South.

Previous season
The Oregon Ducks defeated Utah Utes 37–15 in the Pac-12 Football Championship Game.

Seven teams participated in bowl games, finishing with a record of 4–3. Washington defeated Boise State in the Las Vegas Bowl, 38–7.  USC lost to Iowa in the Holiday Bowl, 24–49.  Washington State lost to Air Force in the Cheez-It Bowl, 21–31.  Arizona State defeated Florida State in the Sun Bowl, 20–14.  Utah lost to Texas in the Alamo Bowl, 10–38.  California defeated Illinois in the Redbox Bowl, 35–20.  Oregon lost to Iowa State in the Fiesta Bowl Game, 34–17.

Preseason
2020 Pac-12 Spring Football and number of signees on signing day:

North Division
California – 
Oregon – 
Oregon State – 
Stanford – 
Washington – 
Washington State –

South Division  
Arizona – 
Arizona State – 
Colorado – 
UCLA – 
USC – 
Utah –

Recruiting classes

Pac-12 Media Days
The Pac-12 will conduct its 2020 Pac-12 media days at the Loews Hollywood Hotel, in Hollywood, California, in July on the Pac-12 Network.

The teams and representatives in respective order were as follows:

 Pac-12 Commissioner – Larry Scott 
 Arizona – Kevin Sumlin (HC), 
 Arizona State – Herm Edwards (HC), 
 California – Justin Wilcox (HC), 
 Colorado – Karl Dorrell (HC), 
 Oregon – Mario Cristobal (HC), 
 Oregon State – Jonathan Smith (HC), 
 Stanford – David Shaw (HC), 
 UCLA – Chip Kelly (HC), 
 USC – Clay Helton (HC), 
 Utah – Kyle Whittingham (HC), 
 Washington – Jimmy Lake (HC), 
 Washington State – Nick Rolovich (HC),

Preseason Media polls
The preseason polls was to be released in July 2020 but due to delaying the season it was released on October 7. Since 1992, the credentialed media has gotten the preseason champion correct just five times. Only nine times has the preseason pick even made it to the Pac-12 title game. Below are the results of the media poll with total points received next to each school and first-place votes in parentheses. For the 2020 poll, Oregon was voted as the favorite to win both the North Division and the Pac–12 Championship Game.

Preseason awards

Preseason All Pac-12

First Team

Second Team

Activism
On August 2, 2020, a few days after the Pac-12 announced a conference only season due to the COVID-19 pandemic, a group of 13 Pac-12 football players from 10 schools released a list of demands including health and safety protections, guaranteed medical coverage for players, elimination of excessive salaries for staff, end to racial injustice in sports and society, and a profit-sharing arrangement whereby 50% of the conference revenues will be distributed evenly among athletes. The players threatened to boycott practices and games unless the demands are met.

Head coaches

Coaching changes
There were three coaching change following the 2019 season, Karl Dorrell (Colorado), Jimmy Lake (Washington) and Nick Rolovich (Washington State).

Coaches
Note: Stats shown are before the beginning of the season.

Rankings

Schedules

All times Pacific time.  Pac-12 teams in bold.

Rankings reflect those of the AP poll for that week.

Regular season
The regular season was originally scheduled to begin on September 26, 2020, and end on December 5, 2020. The Pac-12 Championship Game was scheduled for December 18–19, 2020.  It was announced on July 10, 2020 that all non-conference games would be canceled due to the COVID-19 pandemic.

Week 1

Week 2

Week 3

Week 4

Week 5

Week 6
The game between Stanford and Oregon State was moved from Stanford to Corvallis due to a ban on contact sports in Santa Clara County.

Week 7

Pac-12 Championship Game

The Pac-12 Championship Game, the conference's tenth championship game, will be played on December 18, 2020, at the home stadium of the division champion with the best record. It was planned to be contested by the winners of the North and South divisions. The remaining Pac-12 teams will play a series of seeded games during this week; each team will play against the cross-divisional opponent that finished in the same place in the standings. Washington, the North Division winner, was scheduled to play USC, the South Division winner, in the championship game, but COVID issues forced it back out, allowing the second-best team by record in the North, Oregon, to take their place instead.

Postseason

Bowl games

Rankings are from CFP rankings.  All times Pacific Time Zone.  Pac-12 teams shown in bold.

Selection of teams
Bowl eligible: Arizona State, Colorado, Oregon, Stanford, USC, Utah, Washington
Bowl-ineligible: Arizona, California, Oregon State, UCLA, Washington State
Arizona State, Stanford, USC, and Washington declined to pursue bowl game opportunities. UCLA and Utah opted out of playing in a bowl before their final regular season games and with their eligibility still in doubt.

Awards and honors

Player of the week honors

Pac-12 Individual Awards
The following individuals received postseason honors as voted by the Pac-12 Conference football coaches at the end of the season

All-conference teams
The following players earned All-Pac-12 honors. Any teams showing (_) following their name are indicating the number of All-Pac-12 Conference Honors awarded to that university for 1st team and 2nd team respectively.

First Team

Second Team

† Two-time first team selection

Honorable mentions
ARIZONA: RB Gary Brightwell, Sr.; DB Lorenzo Burns, Sr.; K Lucas Havrisik, Sr.; DL Roy Lopez, Sr.; LB Anthony Pandy, Sr.
ARIZONA STATE: OL Kellen Diesch, Grad.; DB Evan Fields, Sr.; DL Jermayne Lole, Jr.; LB Kyle Soelle, Jr.; RB Rachaad White, Jr.
CALIFORNIA: WR Kekoa Crawford, Sr.; OL Jake Curhan, Sr.; LB Kuony Deng, Sr.; DB Josh Drayden, Sr.; DL Brett Johnson, So.; DL Zeandae Johnson, Sr.; WR/RS Nikko Remigio, Jr.; OL Michael Saffell, Sr.; TE Jake Tonges, Jr.
COLORADO: OL Frank Fillip, So.; DL Terrance Lang, Jr.; DB Isaiah Lewis, Jr.; OL Casey Roddick, So.; RS Dimitri Stanley, So.; LB Carson Wells, Jr.
OREGON: OL Malaesala Aumavae-Laulu, Jr.; OL T.J. Bass, Jr.; RB Travis Dye, Jr.; DL Austin Faoliu, Sr.; DB Jamal Hill, So.; WR Johnny Johnson III, Sr.; LB Noah Sewell, Fr.; LB Isaac Slade-Matautia, Jr.
OREGON STATE: RS Champ Flemings, Jr.; DB Jaydon Grant, Jr.; DL Isaac Hodgins, Jr.; AP/ST Jesiah Irish, So.; OL Nous Keobounnam, Sr.; TE Teagan Quitoriano, Jr.; LB Hamilcar Rashed Jr., R-Sr.; DL Simon Sandberg, Jr.; LB Omar Speights, So.; DB Nahshon Wright, Jr.
STANFORD: DB Malik Antoine, Sr.; RB Houston Heimuli, Sr.; RB Austin Jones, So.; DB Kyu Blu Kelly, So.; QB Davis Mills, Sr.; RS Nathaniel Peat, So.; LB Curtis Robinson, Sr.; OL Walter Rouse, So.; P Ryan Sanborn, So.; DL Thomas Schaffer, Sr.; WR Michael Wilson, Jr.
UCLA: DB Stephan Blaylock, Jr.; LB Caleb Johnson, Jr.; DB Qwuantrezz Knight, Sr.; OL Sam Marrazzo, Jr.; WR/RS Kyle Philips, So.
USC: DL Nick Figueroa, Jr.; DB Olaijah Griffin, Jr.; P Ben Griffiths, So.; K Parker Lewis, Fr.; OL Jalen McKenzie, Jr.; OL Brett Neilon, Jr.; DB Isaiah Pola-Mao, Jr.
UTAH: WR Britain Covey, Jr.; DB JaTravis Broughton, So.; ST Keegan Markgraf, Sr.; LB Nephi Sewell, Jr.
WASHINGTON: OL Henry Bainivalu, Jr.; OL Victor Curne, So.; AP/ST Kyler Gordon, So.; QB Dylan Morris, R-Fr.; OL Luke Wattenberg, Sr.
WASHINGTON STATE: WR Renard Bell, Sr.; OL Brian Greene, Jr.; WR Travell Harris, Jr.; DB Daniel Isom, Sr.; DL Brennan Jackson, R-So.; K Blake Mazza, Jr.; OL Liam Ryan, Sr.; DB Jaylen Watson, R-Jr.; LB Jahad Woods, Sr.

All-Americans

Currently, the NCAA compiles consensus all-America teams in the sports of Division I-FBS football and Division I men's basketball using a point system computed from All-America teams named by coaches associations or media sources.  The system consists of three points for a first-team honor, two points for second-team honor, and one point for third-team honor.  Honorable mention and fourth team or lower recognitions are not accorded any points.  College Football All-American consensus teams are compiled by position and the player accumulating the most points at each position is named first team consensus all-American.  Currently, the NCAA recognizes All-Americans selected by the AP, AFCA, FWAA, TSN, and the WCFF to determine Consensus and Unanimous All-Americans. Any player named to the First Team by all five of the NCAA-recognized selectors is deemed a Unanimous All-American.

*AFCA All-America Team (AFCA)
*Walter Camp All-America Team
*AP All-America teams
*Sporting News All-America Team
*Football Writers Association of America All-America Team (FWAA)
*Sports Illustrated All-America Team
*Report All-America Team (BR)
*College Football News All-America Team (CFN)
*ESPN All-America Team
*CBS Sports All-America Team
*Athlon Sports All-America Team (Athlon)
*The Athletic All-America Team
*USA Today All-America Team

All-Academic

National award winners
2020 College Football Award Winners-->

Home game attendance
On September 24, 2020, the Pac–12 announced that it would only allow student-athlete families to attend football games this season, subject to local public health authority approval and in accordance with NCAA guidelines. Each individual university will determine what will be allowed in terms of family member attendance on that basis. The conference is keeping track of attendance, although the accuracy is in question.  Each team will play three home and three road games, with the possibility of hosting a fourth home game based on where each team finishes within their division, with the top seed from each division playing in the Pac-12 Title Game in Las Vegas.

Bold – Exceed capacity
†Season High

NFL Draft

A total of 28 Pac-12 players were drafted in the 2021 NFL Draft.

The following list includes all Pac–12 Players who were drafted in the 2021 NFL Draft.

References

External links
Game statistics at statbroadcast.com

 
Pac-12 Conference football season